Nothin' But Trouble is the second and final studio album by hard rock band Blue Murder. Released on 31 August 1993 by Geffen Records, the album was produced by the band's vocalist-guitarist John Sykes.

After the disappointing sales of their 1989 debut album, Blue Murder entered a long period of inactivity. According to bassist Tony Franklin and drummer Carmine Appice, Sykes was deeply affected by the record's failure. Eventually the group began work on another album, but progress was slow, partly due to Sykes constructing a new home studio. Meanwhile, Franklin and Appice grew increasingly tired of waiting. Appice left Blue Murder in early 1991 and was briefly replaced by Anders Johansson. Franklin announced his departure in August 1991. Sykes was eventually joined by bassist Marco Mendoza and drummer Tommy O'Steen. However, Franklin had already recorded seven of the songs, while Appice was brought back briefly as session drummer on nine. Keyboardist Nik Green, meanwhile, was promoted to a full-time member, having already played on the group's debut album. Sykes recruited former Baton Rouge vocalist Kelly Keeling as well, but he left shortly before the album's release. Producer Mike Stone was also briefly involved in recording process.

Nothin' But Trouble was generally well received by critics, but commonly described as a step-down from the band's debut album. "We All Fall Down" was released as a single and reached number 35 on the Album Rock Tracks chart. The record itself failed to chart, something Sykes blamed on Geffen Records, who he felt "didn't do anything" to promote the album.

Track listing 
All tracks by John Sykes, except "Itchycoo Park" by Ronnie Lane and Steve Marriott

Personnel
Credits are adapted from the album's liner notes.

References

Footnotes

Sources

External links

1993 albums
Blue Murder (band) albums
Albums produced by John Sykes
Geffen Records albums